Turner Max Ward (born April 11, 1965) is an American professional baseball coach and former outfielder who is the hitting coach for the St. Louis Cardinals of Major League Baseball (MLB). He played in MLB for six teams, over 12 seasons. He previously served as a coach for the Arizona Diamondbacks, Los Angeles Dodgers, and Cincinnati Reds.

Ward was inducted into the Mobile Sports Hall of Fame in 2007.

Major League Career

Cleveland Indians (1990–1991)
Ward was originally drafted by the New York Yankees in the 18th round of the 1986 MLB draft, however, on March 19, 1989, the Yankees traded Ward and Joel Skinner to the Cleveland Indians for Mel Hall.

Ward made his Major League Baseball debut with the Indians on September 10, 1990, as he went 0 for 4 while playing in right field in a 6–2 loss to the Chicago White Sox. On September 12, Ward earned his first career hit off Steve Rosenberg of the White Sox. In his third career game on September 15, Ward went 3 for 5 with a triple, home run and six RBI in a 14–6 win over the Kansas City Royals. Ward hit his first career home run off Andy McGaffigan. Ward finished the season with a .348 batting average with 1 HR and 10 RBI in 14 games with Cleveland.

Ward began the 1991 season as the Indians starting right fielder, however, he got off to a slow start, batting .230 with 0 HR and 5 RBI in 40 games. On June 27, the Indians traded Ward and Tom Candiotti to the Toronto Blue Jays for Denis Boucher, Glenallen Hill, Mark Whiten, and cash.

Toronto Blue Jays (1991–1993)
Ward spent most of his time with the Toronto Blue Jays AAA affiliate, the Syracuse Chiefs of the International League, however, he was a September call-up, and in eight games with Toronto, Ward hit .308 with 0 HR and 2 RBI in 13 at-bats.

Ward once again saw very limited action in 1992 with Toronto, playing in 18 games, where he hit .345 with 1 HR and 3 RBI. He did not play in any playoff games as Toronto won the 1992 World Series.

In 1993, Ward got into 72 games with the Blue Jays, however, he struggled offensively, batting .192 with 4 HR and 28 RBI. He once again did not see any playing time in the post-season, as the Blue Jays repeated as champions by winning the 1993 World Series. On November 24, Ward was selected by the Milwaukee Brewers off waivers.

Milwaukee Brewers (1994–1996)
Ward became an everyday player with the Milwaukee Brewers during the 1994 season, splitting his time between all three outfield positions with the club. He played in 102 games, batting .232 with 9 HR and 45 RBI before the season was cut short due to the 1994 MLB strike.

Ward saw his playing time decrease rapidly in 1995, as he played in only 44 games, batting .264 with 4 HR and 16 RBI with the Brewers.

In 1996, Ward played in 43 games, hitting only .179 with 2 HR and 10 RBI. On November 1, the Brewers released Ward.

Pittsburgh Pirates (1997–1999)
Ward had a very productive 1997 season as the Pirates fourth outfielder, as he played in 71 games, batting .353 with 7 HR and 33 RBI.

On May 3, 1998, Ward broke through the right field wall at Three Rivers Stadium in Pittsburgh while chasing a fly ball. The spectacular catch that resulted was a staple of TV highlight shows for the rest of the year. Ward played in a career high 123 games during the season, batting .262 with 9 HR and 46 RBI.

He began the 1999 season with Pittsburgh, however, Ward struggled to a .209 batting average with 0 HR and 8 RBI in 49 games with the Pirates. On August 11, the club released Ward.

Arizona Diamondbacks (1999–2000)
On August 18, 1999, Ward signed with the Arizona Diamondbacks, helping the club win the NL West with a .348 batting average with 2 HR and 7 RBi in 10 games. In the 1999 NLDS against the New York Mets, Ward played in three games, getting two at-bats, where he had a home run and 3 RBI, however, the D-Backs lost the series.

In 2000, Ward hit .173 with 0 HR and 4 RBI with Arizona in 15 games. On October 5, he was released.

Philadelphia Phillies (2001)
On December 20, 2000, Ward signed with the Philadelphia Phillies, and in the 2001 season, Ward played in 17 games with the club, batting .267 with 0 HR and 2 RBI. On October 8, he was granted free agency, then retired.

Major league career (1990–2001)
Ward played in 12 seasons during his Major League Baseball career, appearing in 626 games, as he had a .251 batting average with 39 HR and 219 RBI. Ward had 389 career hits, and stole 33 bases. Defensively, he recorded a .988 fielding percentage playing at all three outfield positions. He was a member of the 1992 and 1993 World Series champions, the Toronto Blue Jays.

Coaching career

State College Spikes
Ward managed the State College Spikes of the New York–Penn League in 2007, leading the club to a 36–39 record, as the club finished in third place in the Pinckney Division.

Mobile BayBears
Ward became the manager of the Mobile BayBears, the Arizona Diamondbacks AA affiliate in the Southern League, in the 2011 season. Ward coached the BayBears for two seasons, 2011 and 2012, leading the team to two consecutive Southern League championships. He earned the 2011 Southern League Manager of the Year.

Arizona Diamondbacks
In 2013, Ward became an assistant hitting coach for the Arizona Diamondbacks. Notably, he was thrown out of the game during a massive brawl between the Diamondbacks and the Dodgers on June 11, 2013. He became full-time hitting coach in 2014.

Los Angeles Dodgers
Ward became the hitting coach for the Los Angeles Dodgers in 2016.

Cincinnati Reds
On November 6, 2018, Ward was named the new hitting coach of the Cincinnati Reds.

On October 1, 2019, the Cincinnati Reds announced that Ward would not be retained.

St. Louis Cardinals
On November 15th, 2021, the St. Louis Cardinals hired Ward to be their assistant hitting coach. On November 6th, 2022, the Cardinals announced the promotion of Ward to Hitting Coach.

References

External links

 

1965 births
Living people
Altoona Curve players
American expatriate baseball players in Canada
Arizona Diamondbacks coaches
Arizona Diamondbacks players
Baseball players from Alabama
Baseball players from Florida
Beloit Snappers players
Calgary Cannons players
Canton-Akron Indians players
Cincinnati Reds coaches
Cleveland Indians players
Colorado Springs Sky Sox players
Columbus Clippers players
Fort Lauderdale Yankees players
Gulf Coast Indians players
Knoxville Smokies players
Los Angeles Dodgers coaches
Major League Baseball hitting coaches
Major League Baseball outfielders
Milwaukee Brewers players
Minor league baseball managers
Nashville Sounds players
New Orleans Zephyrs players
Oneonta Yankees players
Scranton/Wilkes-Barre Red Barons players
Philadelphia Phillies players
Pittsburgh Pirates players
South Alabama Jaguars baseball players
Syracuse Chiefs players
Toronto Blue Jays players
Tucson Sidewinders players